Fair Oaks is an unincorporated community located in Henrico County, Virginia. Fair Oaks Station was located on the Richmond and York River Railroad and played a role in the Peninsula Campaign in 1862 during the American Civil War. A major battle was fought nearby, known variously as the Battle of Fair Oaks or the Battle of Seven Pines.

References

Unincorporated communities in Virginia
Unincorporated communities in Henrico County, Virginia